Tomoplagia discolor is a species of tephritid or fruit flies in the genus Tomoplagia of the family Tephritidae.

Distribution
Cuba, Puerto Rico.

References

Tephritinae
Insects described in 1862
Diptera of South America